Zlatan Ibrahimbegović (born 18 March 1948) is a Yugoslav retired slalom canoeist who competed from the late 1960s to the late 1970s. He finished 29th in the K-1 event at the 1972 Summer Olympics in Munich. He now lives in western Australia and teaches canoe slalom classes at swan canoe club
in Perth. He also competes in national championships, including 2017 at Penrith whitewater stadium.

References
Sports-reference.com profile

1948 births
Canoeists at the 1972 Summer Olympics
Living people
Olympic canoeists of Yugoslavia
Yugoslav male canoeists